Ecography is a monthly peer-reviewed scientific journal published by Wiley-Blackwell on behalf of the Nordic Society Oikos covering the field of spatial ecology. It has been published since 1978, the first 14 volumes under the name Holarctic Ecology.

Ecography is published in collaboration with Oikos, Journal of Avian Biology, Nordic Journal of Botany, Lindbergia and Wildlife Biology. It is available as an open-access publication via Wiley.

According to the Journal Citation Reports, the journal has an impact factor of 6.802 as of 2021, ranking it 7th out of 65 journals in the category "Biodiversity Conservation" and 18th out of 174 journals in the category "Ecology".

Scope 
The journal covers the following fields:
 population ecology and community ecology
 macroecology
 biogeography
 ecological conservation

References

External links 
 Wiley Website
 Official Website
 Virtual Special Issue

Ecology journals
Publications established in 1978
Wiley-Blackwell academic journals
English-language journals
Bimonthly journals